The Graduate Group in the Art and Archaeology of the Mediterranean World (AAMW) is an interdisciplinary program for research and teaching of archaeology, particularly archaeology and art of the ancient Mediterranean (Greece and Rome), Egypt, Anatolia, and the Near East, based in the Penn Museum of the University of Pennsylvania.

History
Doctoral work in Mediterranean and Near Eastern Archaeology has been a feature of the University of Pennsylvania since 1898, largely in response to the excavations undertaken by the Penn Museum. Nearly 200 dissertations in Old World Archaeology and Art have been produced at Penn in the course of the last century.

The eminent archaeologist Rodney Young, the director of the Penn Museum's excavations at Gordion that uncovered the royal tomb of King Midas, strengthened the graduate program during the 1960s and 1970s.

Core faculty
The current Chair of the Program is Thomas F. Tartaron. Other notable faculty include Philip P. Betancourt, Lothar Haselberger, Holly Pittman, and C. Brian Rose.

Current fieldwork
 Gordion, Turkey
 Halil Rud Archaeological Project, Iran
 Marsa Matruh, Egypt
 Villa Magna, Italy
 Vrokastro, Crete, Greece
 Mount Lykaion, Greece
 Ur, Iraq
 Tell es-Sweyhat, Syria

Notable alumni

The AAMW program and its predecessors have graduated a number of prominent archaeologists, including:

 George Bass (PhD., 1964), professor emeritus at Texas A&M University and an early practitioner of underwater archaeology
 Crawford "Greenie" Greenewalt Jr. (PhD., 1966), past director of the excavations at Sardis and professor at the University of California, Berkeley
 Philip Betancourt (PhD., 1970), Director of the Institute for Aegean Prehistory and professor at Temple University
 G. Kenneth Sams (PhD., 1971), past director of the Gordion excavations and professor at the University of North Carolina at Chapel Hill
 Jeremy Rutter (PhD., 1974), ceramics specialist and professor at Dartmouth College
 Zahi Hawass (PhD., 1987), past Minister of Antiquities of Egypt
 Jodi Magness (PhD., 1989),  co-director of the excavations in the late Roman fort at Yotvata, Israel and professor at the University of North Carolina at Chapel Hill

See also
Outline of archaeology
University of Pennsylvania Museum of Archaeology and Anthropology
Vrokastro
Joukowsky Institute for Archaeology and the Ancient World

References

External links
 Graduate Group in the Art and Archaeology of the Mediterranean World
  University of Pennsylvania Museum of Archaeology and Anthropology
 Thinking of Graduate School in Classical Archaeology?, prepared by Jennifer Gates-Foster and Tim Moore, Department of Classics, The University of Texas at Austin

Archaeological research institutes
University of Pennsylvania
University of Pennsylvania Museum of Archaeology and Anthropology
1898 establishments in Pennsylvania